Aaj Aur Kal is a 1963 Indian Hindi-language film produced and directed by Vasant Joglekar. The film stars Sunil Dutt, Nanda, Tanuja, Ashok Kumar and Deven Verma. It was given a U certificate and re-certified with the same rating after 9 cuts by the censor board in 1981.  It is an adaptation of The Barretts of Wimpole Street (1934 film) and The Barretts of Wimpole Street (1957 film).

Plot
It's the story of a fastidious king Balbir Singh (Ashok Kumar) of Himmatpur, whose stern, high handed behaviour leads to a breakdown in communication with his four children; eldest daughter Hemalata (Nanda), younger daughter Ashalata (Tanuja) and sons Pratap (Rohit Kumar) and Rajendra (Deven Verma). His intimidating commands lead to partial paralysis of Hemlata's lower limbs and also a simmering discontent amongst other descendants. After numerous attempts fail to cure Hemalata, the king hires a new doctor, Sanjay (Sunil Dutt), who contrary to expectations, is not just young and handsome, but also against silly protocols that hamper laughter, fun and frolic. Dr. Sanjay's experimentations provide greater mobility and joy to the youngsters, giving them a fresh lease of life and a much needed voice of rebellion. Transcending normal barriers of doctor-client confidentiality, Sanjay and Hemalata fall in love and the romance enables her to walk in double quick time on her feet! Initially reluctant, the king awakens to a new dawn of freedom and humbly accepts not just their relationship, but also Ashalata's betrothal to social activist (Soodesh Kumar), who defeats him in a general election.

Cast 
Ashok Kumar as Maharaja Balvir Singh
Sunil Dutt as Dr. Sanjay
Nanda as Rajkumari Hemlata "Hema"
Tanuja as Rajkumari Ashalata "Asha"
Deven Verma as Rajendra
Sudesh Kumar as Ashalata's Friend
Agha as Rajkumar Dhanak Singh
Dhumal as Dhanak Singh's Secretary
 Kusum Deshpande as Sister

Music
All lyrics provided by Sahir Ludhianvi & music by Ravi.

References

External links
 

1963 films
1960s Hindi-language films
Films scored by Ravi